Mcdonaldocnus is an extinct genus of nothrotheriid ground sloths that lived during the Middle Miocene and Early Pliocene  of what is now Bolivia and Argentina. It was originally placed in the genus Xyophorus but was subsequently recognized as a distinct genus by Gaudin and colleagues in 2022. The authors reassigned the material of "Xyophorus" bondesioi, Xyophorus villarroeli and Xyophorus sp. to Mcdonaldocnus. Fossils of Mcdonaldocnus have been found in the Cerro Azul Formation of Argentina.

Etymology 
The genus name, Mcdonaldocnus, is composed of the prefix Mcdonald-, which honors the retired U.S. Bureau of Land Management scientist Dr. H. Gregory McDonald, a notable sloth specialist, and the greek suffix -ocnus, meaning "hesitating or inactive", which is commonly used to name extinct sloths. The species name, Mcdonaldocnus bondesioi, honors the paleontologist Pedro Bondesio

Description

References 

Prehistoric sloths
Prehistoric placental genera
Miocene xenarthrans
Miocene mammals of South America
Pliocene xenarthrans
Pliocene mammals of South America
Montehermosan
Huayquerian
Chasicoan
Mayoan
Laventan
Colloncuran
Friasian
Fossil taxa described in 2022
Neogene Bolivia
Fossils of Bolivia
Neogene Argentina
Fossils of Argentina
Cerro Azul Formation